Alan Uryga (born 19 February 1994) is a Polish professional footballer who plays as a centre-back for Polish side Wisła Kraków.

Club career
Born in Kraków, Uryga made his debut for Wisła Kraków in the Ekstraklasa on 7 April 2012 in a match against Jagiellonia Białystok.

On 4 September 2017, he signed a contract with Wisła Płock.

International career
Uryga was the captain of Poland national under-17 football team during 2011 UEFA Under-17 Championship qualifying round. Uryga made his first appearance for Poland national under-18 football team on 25 October 2011 in a match friendly against Slovenia.

Career statistics

Club

References

External links
 
 

Living people
1994 births
Footballers from Kraków
Association football central defenders
Polish footballers
Poland youth international footballers
Poland under-21 international footballers
Ekstraklasa players
Wisła Kraków players
Wisła Płock players